David J. Steil (born March 19, 1942) is a Republican politician who formerly served as a member of the Pennsylvania House of Representatives for the 31st District, being elected in 1992.

Biography
Steil and his wife live in Yardley, Pennsylvania and have two children. He retired prior to the 2008 election, and was succeeded by Democrat Steve Santarsiero.

Life after the Pennsylvania House
Steil went on to become a supporter of Medicare for All in 2019, writing an op-ed in the USA Today that he "believe[s] it’s possible for markets to fail, because there are services that they’re incapable of providing efficiently". Continuing by stating "There’s no better example [of a market failure] than our health insurance system." As of the time of authoring that op-ed, he was serving as the CEO for the MicroTrap Corporation.

References

External links
Pennsylvania House of Representatives - David J. Steil official PA House website
Pennsylvania House Republican Caucus - Representative David J. Steil official Party website
Biography, voting record, and interest group ratings at Project Vote Smart

1942 births
Living people
People from Stearns County, Minnesota
Republican Party members of the Pennsylvania House of Representatives
People from Yardley, Pennsylvania
St. John's University (New York City) alumni
University of Minnesota alumni